The Taipei Municipal Fuxing Senior High School is a high school in Beitou District, Taipei, Taiwan.

History
The school was established in 1953.

Transportation
The school is accessible within walking distance north of Xinbeitou Station of Taipei Metro.

See also
 Education in Taiwan

References 

1953 establishments in Taiwan
High schools in Taiwan
School buildings completed in 1953